Yevgeni Vladimirovich Kryukov (born 3 August 1963) is a Russian professional football coach and a former player.

Club career
He made his professional debut in the Soviet Second League in 1981 for FC Torpedo Rubtsovsk.

References

1963 births
Living people
People from Rubtsovsk
Soviet footballers
Russian footballers
Association football goalkeepers
Russian Premier League players
FC Rostov players
FC Zhemchuzhina Sochi players
Russian football managers
FC Kristall Smolensk players
FC Torpedo Moscow players
Sportspeople from Altai Krai